"Hot Right Now" is a single by English drum and bass producer DJ Fresh featuring English singer Rita Ora, released on 13 February 2012 as the second single from his third studio album, Nextlevelism (2012), before later being included as a bonus track on Ora's debut studio album Ora (2012). 

"Hot Right Now" debuted at the top of UK Singles Chart on 19 February 2012. The Official Charts Company confirmed "Hot Right Now" as the UK's first ever drum and bass number one.

Background and composition
In July 2011, DJ Fresh released "Louder", the first single from his third studio album, Nextlevelism. It reached peak position on the UK Singles Chart, giving DJ Fresh his first ever number one. After "Louder", Fresh started working on "Hot Right Now" and as he was looking for a vocalist for the song, he came across Ora's cover videos on YouTube. Daniel Stein and The Invisible Men wrote the song while Daniel Stein and Wez Clarke produced it.

Critical reception
Robert Copsey of Digital Spy gave the song a mixed review stating:

Judging by the results of his latest track, we assume that the burden became all-too-great. Yes, the head-spinning breakneck beats and fuzzy basslines are impressive, as are the efforts of rising Roc Nation-signed guest singer Rita Ora, but there's something lacking here that made 'Louder' the hit that it was. Our suggestion? Lyrics such as "Turn it up right now/ Put your hands in the air if you want it right now" can't be doing him many favours. .

Commercial performance
"Hot Right Now" debuted at number one on the UK Singles Chart, becoming DJ Fresh's second and Ora's first UK number one, selling over 128,000 copies in its first week. By the end of the year, "Hot Right Now" sold 482,000 copies in the United Kingdom, making it the 23rd best-selling single of 2012.

Music video
The music video for the song was directed by Rohan BM and filmed in Los Angeles.

Track listings

Charts

Weekly charts

Year-end charts

Certifications

Release history

References

2012 singles
DJ Fresh songs
UK Singles Chart number-one singles
2012 songs
Songs written by Jason Pebworth
Songs written by George Astasio
Songs written by Jon Shave
Rita Ora songs
Ministry of Sound singles
Song recordings produced by DJ Fresh
Songs written by DJ Fresh